David McMillan (September 20, 1981 – May 18, 2013) was a professional American and Canadian football defensive end. He was drafted by the Cleveland Browns in the fifth round of the 2005 NFL Draft. He played college football for the Kansas Jayhawks.

College career
McMillan started 37 of 46 games at defensive end for the University of Kansas and collected 150 tackles with 15 sacks, 30 stops for losses, 19 quarterback pressures, five forced fumbles, 2 fumble recoveries, and 2 interceptions.

Professional career

Cleveland Browns
McMillan was selected by the Browns in the fifth round (139th overall) of the 2005 NFL Draft. He was waived by the Browns on August 30, 2008 prior to the 2008 season

Toronto Argonauts
McMillan was signed by the Toronto Argonauts on April 9, 2009 and was cut at the end of training camp.

Death
McMillan was shot and killed in an apparent robbery attempt in Georgia in May 2013.

References

1981 births
2013 deaths
People from Hinesville, Georgia
American football linebackers
Kansas Jayhawks football players
Cleveland Browns players
Toronto Argonauts players
Deaths by firearm in Georgia (U.S. state)
American murder victims
Male murder victims
People murdered in Georgia (U.S. state)